Azteca aesopus is a species of ant in the genus Azteca. Described by Auguste-Henri Forel in 1908, the species is endemic to Brazil.

References

Azteca (genus)
Hymenoptera of South America
Insects described in 1908